The William B. Bankhead National Forest is one of Alabama's four National Forests, covering .  It is home to Alabama's only National Wild and Scenic River, the Sipsey Fork.  It is located in northwestern Alabama, around the town of Double Springs. It is named in honor of William B. Bankhead, a longtime U.S. Representative from Alabama.

Known as the "land of a thousand waterfalls", this National Forest is popular for hiking, horseback riding, hunting, boating, fishing, swimming, canoeing and more. Within the forest lies the Sipsey Wilderness, with a host of wildlife and an abundance of swift streams, limestone bluffs, and waterfalls.  Native American relics abound in Bankhead, one of the Southern United States's premier sites for petroglyphs, prehistoric drawings, and rock carvings, at sites such as the Kinlock Shelter.

The forest is headquartered in Montgomery, as are all four of Alabama's National Forests. The other National Forests in the state are Conecuh, Talladega, and Tuskegee. There are local ranger district offices located in Double Springs.

On June 19, 1936, it was renamed Black Warrior National Forest, which in turn was renamed William B. Bankhead National Forest on June 6, 1942. In 1959,  removed land from the forest's boundaries.

References

External links

 William B. Bankhead National Forest
 

Archaeological sites in Alabama
Protected areas of Franklin County, Alabama
Protected areas of Lawrence County, Alabama
National Forests of Alabama
Protected areas of Winston County, Alabama